Parents for Education Foundation (PAREF) is an educational foundation established by parents that administers schools for basic education in the Philippines. It owns several single-sex Catholic schools that are closely affiliated with Opus Dei.

Profile
Founded in 1976, PAREF Schools aim to provide personal integral education to their students. Its core educational philosophy rests on the principle, supported by research, that the fullness of a child's education is effectively realized through the integral formation first of the parents, second of the teachers, the two most influential teachers of children.

Member schools
PAREF presently has sixteen (16) schools:

References

External links
https://paref.edu.ph/

Educational organizations based in the Philippines
Organizations established in 1975
1975 establishments in the Philippines